Norah Kathleen May Gurney (née Dewar) (1921 - 5 February 1974) was a British archivist and Director of the Borthwick Institute.

Biography
Norah was born in London and studied modern history at St. Hugh's College, Oxford. During the Second World War she worked in naval intelligence. In 1942 she married 2nd lieutenant Gerald D. Gurney. In 1946, after the end of her marriage, she joined Sheffield County Library and worked in the local history and archives department. In 1956 she became assistant archivist to Canon J.S. Purvis as at the Borthwick Institute for Archives, eventually succeeding him as Archivist-in-Charge from 1963 and going on to the role of Director in 1971.

Norah served on the Council of the British Records Association and on the British sub-committee of the Commission Internationale d’Histoire Ecclésiastique Comparée. She served on the committees of several local histories: as treasurer of the Canterbury and York Society, as vice-president of the Surtees Society, and Chair of the Yorkshire Archaeological Society.

Publications
Gurney, N.K.M. and Clay, C. 1971. Fasti parochiales.  Leeds, Yorkshire Archaeological Society.
Gurney, N.K.M. 1976. A handlist of parish register transcripts in the Borthwick Institute of Historical Research (Borthwick Texts and Calendars: Records of the Northern Province 3). York, Borthwick Institute.
Gurney, N.K.M. 1983. The Parish registers of Easingwold, Raskelf, and Myton upon Swale.

References

1921 births
1974 deaths
British archivists
Alumni of St Hugh's College, Oxford
Royal Navy personnel of World War II
People from London